Clypeobarbus pleuropholis is a species of ray-finned fish in the genus Clypeobarbus.

References 

 

Clypeobarbus
Fish described in 1899